Oreopanax  dactylifolius is a shrub or small tree endemic to Mexico.

Description 
Oreopanax  dactylifolius is evergreen, and has a medium growth rate, with a mature height of at least 10 feet. The 5-lobed, generally symmetrical leaves resemble maple leaves, light green with a bronze tinge, but with texture reminding one of its ivy-like relatives. The branch structure is very emphatic and the bark texture similar to that of ivy in its bushy or arborescent stage.

Cultivation
Oreopanax  dactylifolius is sometimes used in horticulture for its form and decorative foliage.

A specimen tentatively identified as this species has been growing at the "Vets Garden," a therapy garden attached to the Veterans Affairs Hospital of Sawtelle, Los Angeles, CA USA, (90073), for at least 30 years and perhaps more than 40. It was not affected by a winter mid 20s /low 30s frost in early 2007.

External links
Profile

dactylifolius
Endemic flora of Mexico
Trees of Southeastern Mexico
Ornamental trees
Garden plants of North America